The Ozark Trails Marker at Lake Arthur, in Lake Arthur, New Mexico, was built in 1921.  It is located at the junction of Main and Broadway Streets in Lake Arthur.  It was listed on the National Register of Historic Places in 2004.

It was one of eight markers in New Mexico's portion of the trail.  Some of the others were deemed road hazards and were removed.

It recognizes the Ozark Trail, an early roadway supported by state-level automobile associations.

References

Obelisks in the United States
National Register of Historic Places in Chaves County, New Mexico
Monuments and memorials in New Mexico
Buildings and structures completed in 1921
Auto trails in the United States